Jim Parrack (born February 8, 1981) is an American actor best known for his role as Hoyt Fortenberry in HBO series True Blood. He has also appeared in the film Battle: Los Angeles and as "Slim" in the 2014 Broadway production of Of Mice and Men alongside James Franco, Chris O'Dowd and Leighton Meester. In 2020, he began starring in the Fox drama 9-1-1: Lone Star.

Early life
Parrack was born on February 8, 1981, in Allen, Texas. He attended the co-ed Allen High School for secondary education. In 2001, Parrack moved to Los Angeles, California where he studied acting at The Stella Adler Academy and then at the Playhouse West.

Career
Parrack made his screen debut in the 2006 drama film Annapolis. From 2006 to 2008, he made multiple guest appearances on television shows such as Monk, Grey's Anatomy, CSI: Crime Scene Investigation, and Criminal Minds. In 2008, Parrack was cast as Hoyt Fortenberry in the vampire television drama series True Blood. He was part of the main starring cast for the first five seasons, before departing for a season. Parrack returned to the show for the seventh and final season, again as a main cast member.

In 2011, Parrack returned to feature films, starring in the military science fiction war film Battle: Los Angeles. The film was directed by Jonathan Liebesman and co-starred Aaron Eckhart, Michelle Rodriguez, Bridget Moynahan, Ne-Yo, and Michael Peña. In 2013, he starred in the drama film Child of God and the Spanish-American drama A Night in Old Mexico. He co-starred in the films Fury (2014), The Adderall Diaries (2015), and Suicide Squad (2016). In 2014, Parrack joined the Broadway cast of Of Mice and Men, playing the role of Slim.

Personal life
Parrack married actress/writer/director Ciera Danielle on October 19, 2008. He and Danielle separated in September 2013, and in June 2014 it was reported the couple had filed for divorce due to irreconcilable differences.  In Spring 2014, it was confirmed he was in a relationship with The Hunger Games actress Leven Rambin. On October 10, 2015, he and Rambin married in Texas. On May 9, 2017, the couple split ending their two-year marriage. Rambin filed and was granted an annulment, and the marriage was dissolved. Rambin has since referred to her relationship with Parrack as "abusive", later revealing that he had cheated on her. He has been in a relationship with ballet dancer Hayley Walters since at least 2018. Parrack is the president of 120 Productions, Inc. He is good friends with actor James Franco.

Filmography

Films

Television

Other works

Awards and nominations

References

External links
 Jim Parrack on Facebook
 Jim Parrack on Twitter
 
 Jim Parrack on Myspace
 120 Productions on YouTube

1981 births
Male actors from Texas
American male film actors
American male stage actors
American male television actors
Living people
21st-century American male actors
People from Allen, Texas